"Burnin' Up" is the lead single from American pop rock band the Jonas Brothers' third studio album, A Little Bit Longer, and was officially released on June 24, 2008. In the United Kingdom, it was released as a double A-side with "When You Look Me in the Eyes". The single was a hit via digital downloads, and peaked at number five on the Billboard Hot 100, becoming the group's first top five single in the US and formerly their highest-charting song as a group until "Sucker" was released in 2019. The song features uncredited vocals from American rapper Big Rob.

Background and composition

The band first performed this song on their When You Look Me in the Eyes Tour as well as at the 2008 Disney Channel Games. Their summer tour, titled the Burnin' Up Tour, is named after this song. The song also features a rap from their bodyguard, Robert "Big Rob" Feggans.

Entertainment Weekly stated that the song "was inspired by Jonas Brothers' unlikely appreciation for the work of babe magnet Prince." Nick Jonas also stated that the song is "about this girl — maybe she's at a party — and you feel that immediate connection [and] both know it's there." The song was also included on Grammy Nominees 2009.

Critical reception
Time critic Josh Tyrangiel named this the sixth best song of 2008. The song however has been criticized for the chorus line's similarity to the song "Makes Me Wonder" by Maroon 5.

Commercial performance
With strong digital sales, "Burnin' Up" debuted at number five on the US Billboard Hot 100, making it the band's most successful single until "Sucker" debuted at number one in March 2019. With more than 183,000 downloads and sold the single for the first week it went on sale. As of February 2015, it has sold 1.9 million copies in the US. In 2019, it was certified double platinum by the RIAA.

Music video
The music video for "Burnin' Up" premiered after the premiere of Camp Rock on the Disney Channel on June 20, 2008. In the video, the brothers read over a potential video treatment and imagine how the video would play out, in which they are portrayed as action stars. Nick as James Bond in "Double Inferno", Joe as a Sonny Crockett parody in "Hot Tropic", and Kevin as a Kung Fu master in "The Burning Dragon". The video featured cameo appearances from Selena Gomez, David Carradine, Robert Davi and Danny Trejo. The video was directed by Brendan Malloy and Tim Wheeler. The video was nominated for Video of the Year and Best Pop Video at the 2008 MTV Video Music Awards, but both lost to Britney Spears and the video for her song "Piece of Me". The video also took notes from Spike Jonze's iconic video for "Sabotage" by the Beastie Boys. This can be most seen in the scenes with Joe Jonas portraying an 80's TV-style cop with a fake mustache.

Track listing
US and Europe CD single
 "Burnin' Up" – 2:54
 "Burnin' Up (No-Rap)" – 2:37

Charts

Weekly charts

Year-end charts

Certifications

Release history

Notes

References

2008 singles
Jonas Brothers songs
Songs written by Kevin Jonas
Songs written by Joe Jonas
Songs written by Nick Jonas
Hollywood Records singles
2008 songs
Song recordings produced by John Fields (record producer)